The German Medical Journal is an independent English-language magazine from Germany for an international medical community. With its digital edition and its bilingualism (Arabic–English and Russian–English), the magazine has a broad international circulation. The German Medical Journal is published by Bennad Ltd.

The magazine keeps readers up to date about the status of medicine; it presents innovations from diagnostics and therapy and lets selected specialists from the various medical fields have their say. The featured editorials are written by renowned specialists. The Advisory Board of the German Medical Journal consists of German University professors.

The German Medical Journal was established as an Arabic-English printed magazine. The first issue has been published in January 2007. In 2008, the Bennad Ltd. founded the German Medical Online Portal. In 2009, the publishing house launched the German Medical Journal Digital Edition. Since 2010, it is published in Russian-English too. The magazine is financed by adverts and completely independent. The German Medical Journal is addressed mainly to physicians of the different disciplines. All issues are available online.

References

External links 
 German Medical Journal - Profile
 German Medical Journal - official website
 German Medical Online Portal
 German Medical Journal - Issues for Download
 German National Library

2007 establishments in Germany
Medical magazines
General medical journals
Arabic-language magazines
Russian-language magazines
English-language magazines
Professional and trade magazines
Magazines established in 2007